William Haute may refer to:

 William Hawte or Haute, composer
William Haute (MP), English politician